Grade moj (English translation: My Town) is the eleventh studio album of Bosnian singer Halid Bešlić. It was released in 1993.

Track listing
Ja se Bosni spremam (I'm Getting Ready For Bosnia)
Kad tad (As Soon as Possible)
Od sabaha do jacije (From Sabah to Jacija)
Jače od okova (Stronger Than Chains)
Stani, zoro (Stop, Dawn)
Grade moj (My City)
Djeco Bosanska (Bosnian Children)
Da zna zora (So the Morning Knows, featuring Željko Bebek)

References

1993 albums
Halid Bešlić albums